Christian Geovanny Cruz Tapia (born 1 August 1992) is an Ecuadorian footballer who plays as a left-back defender for Ecuadorian Serie A side C.S. Emelec.

Career
Cruz started playing for Barcelona SC in 2010 and was signed permanently by the club in the aftermath of the 2011 FIFA U-20 World Cup.

Cruz played for L.D.U. Quito in the 2018 season on loan from Guayaquil City. LDU Quito signed him permanently after the loan deal ended.

Honours
LDU Quito
Ecuadorian Serie A: 2018
Copa Ecuador: 2019
Supercopa Ecuador: 2020, 2021

References

1992 births
Living people
Ecuadorian footballers
Ecuador international footballers
Ecuadorian Serie A players
Barcelona S.C. footballers
Guayaquil City F.C. footballers
L.D.U. Quito footballers
Sportspeople from Guayaquil
Association football fullbacks